The Extreme North or Far North is a large part of Russia located mainly north of the Arctic Circle and boasting enormous mineral and natural resources. Formally, the regions of the Extreme North comprise the whole of Chukotka Autonomous Okrug, Kamchatka Krai, Magadan Oblast, Murmansk Oblast and Sakha, as well as certain parts and cities of Arkhangelsk Oblast, Irkutsk Oblast, Khabarovsk Krai, Komi Republic, Krasnoyarsk Krai, Republic of Karelia, Sakhalin Oblast, Tuva, Tyumen Oblast, as well as all islands of the Arctic Ocean, its seas, the Bering Sea, and the Sea of Okhotsk.

Due to the harsh conditions of the area, people who work there have traditionally been entitled by the Russian government to higher wages than workers of other regions. As a result of the climate and environment, the indigenous peoples of the area have developed certain genetic differences that allow them to better cope with the region's environment, as do their cultures.

Largest cities
Arkhangelsk (pop. 349,742), Yakutsk (pop. 322,987), Murmansk (287,847), Severodvinsk (181,990), Norilsk (181,830), Petropavlovsk-Kamchatsky (181,216), Novy Urengoi (118,033), Noyabrsk (110,620), and Magadan (92,052) are the largest cities within the Russian Far North proper. The larger and more southern Surgut (380,632) is the largest among cities and territories "equated" to the Far North.

Legal status
The Far North is known for its extremely harsh climate. People who work there, other than indigenous populations involved in traditional occupations and inmates of labor camps (e.g., the gulags of the Soviet Union), receive an extra grade of payment, referred to as the "Northern Bonus" (severnye nadbavki ). Additional benefits include extra vacation, extra disability benefits, extra retirement benefits (a lower retirement age), and housing benefits, in compensation for the difficult working conditions. Such compensation began under the Soviet Union and has been maintained by the Russian Federation.

In January 2007, the State Duma Committee for Issues of the North and Far East approved a proposed law defining regions within the Far North that would determine the extent of compensation for workers. The regions were established based on general climate, with harsher regions garnering greater compensation relative to milder regions.

See also

 Land of Darkness
 List of Russian explorers
 Northern Sea Route
 Russian North
 Russian Far East
 Small-numbered indigenous peoples of Extreme North

References

Regions of Russia
Russian Far East
Geography of Siberia
Historical regions in Russia
Historical regions
Regions of the Arctic